The RBU-6000 Smerch-2 (Реактивно-Бомбовая Установка, Reaktivno-Bombovaja Ustanovka; reaction engine-bomb installation & Смерч; waterspout) is a 213 mm caliber Soviet anti-submarine rocket launcher. It is similar in principle to the Royal Navy Hedgehog system used during the Second World War. The system entered service in 1960–1961 and is fitted to a wide range of Russian surface vessels. It consists of a horseshoe-shaped arrangement of twelve launch barrels, that are remotely directed by the Burya fire control system (that can also control the shorter ranged RBU-1000). It fires RGB-60 unguided depth charges. The rockets are normally fired in salvos of 1, 2, 4, 8 or 12 rounds. Reloading is automatic, with individual rounds being fed into the launcher by the 60UP loading system from a below deck magazine. Typical magazine capacity is either 72 or 96 rounds per launcher. It can also be used for shore bombardment.

The  system is an upgrade of the RBU-6000 system, firing the 90R rocket, which is actively guided in the water. The warhead is a  shaped charge, which enables it to punch through the hulls of submarines. It can also be used against divers and torpedoes. System response time is reported to be 15 seconds and a single-salvo has a kill probability of 0.8. RPK-8 entered service in 1991 and mounted on Project 1154 and 11356 frigates. Serial production of the upgraded 90R1 rocket was launched in 2017.

RBU-6000 were the most widespread anti-submarine rocket launchers in the Soviet Navy, used on many ship classes.

Launcher
 Weight: 3,100 kg (empty)
 Length: 2 m
 Height: 2.25 m
 Width: 1.75 m
 Elevation: -15° to +65°
 Traverse: 180°

RGB-60 projectile
 Weight: 113.5 kg
 Warhead: 23 kg
 Diameter: 0.212 m
 Length: 1.83 m
 Range:
 Ballistic 1: 350 m to 1700 m
 Ballistic 2: 1500 m to 5500 m
 Depth: 10 to 500 m
 Sink rate: 11.6m/s

90R projectile
 Weight: 112.5 kg
 Warhead: 19.5 kg
 Diameter: 0.212 m
 Length: 1.83 m
 Range: 600 m to 4,300 m
 Effective radius: 130 m
 Depth range:
 Submarines: 0 to 1,000 m
 Torpedoes and divers: 4–10 m

Ships
Ship classes fitted with RBU-6000 (list not complete)

  (Project 1123)
  (Project 1143/1143M)
  (Project 58)
  (Project 1134)
  (Project 1134A)
  (Project 1134B)
  (Project 1144/11442)
  (Project 1164)
 Kotlin-SAM-class destroyer (Project 56K/56A/56AE)
  (Project 57A)
  (Project 61/61M/61MP)
  (Project 1155)
 Burevestnik/Burevestnik M-class frigate (Project 1135/1135M)
  (Project 1154)
  (Project 1159)
  (Project 11661)
 Petya II/III-class frigate (Project 159A/159AE)
  (Project 35/35M)
 Grisha I/III/IV/V-class corvette (Project 1124.1/1124M/1124K/1124ME)
 Parchim II-class corvette (Project 133.1M)
  (Project 204)
 Soviet border Guard Russian Border Guard
 Nerei-class frigate (Project 11351)
 Grisha II/V-class corvette (Project 1124P/1124ME)

 Nerei-class frigate (Project 11351)
 Petya II-class frigate (Project 159A)
 Grisha II/V-class corvette (Project 1124P/1124ME)

 Kotlin-SAM-class destroyer (Project 56AE)
 Kashin-class destroyer (Project 61MP)
  corvette (Project 620)

 
 

 Koni-class frigate (Project 1159)
 Poti-class corvette (Project 204)

 Grisha III-class corvette (Project 1124M)

 Petya II-class frigate (Project 159A)

 Koni-class frigate (Project 1159)
  (Project 1159)

 Koni-class frigate (Project 1159)
 Parchim I-class corvette (Project 133)

  (Project 61ME)
  (Project 15)
  (Project 15A)
  (Project 15B)
  (Project 11356)
  (Project 17)
  (Project 28)
 Vietnam People's Navy
 Petya II/III-class frigate (Project 159A/159AE)

 Parchim I-class corvette (Project 133)

 Koni-class frigate (Project 1159TP)

 Petya III-class frigate (Project 159AE)

 Koni-class frigate (Project 1159T)

 Petya II-class frigate (Project 159A)

 Koni-class frigate (Project 1159T)

References

 The Naval Institute Guide to World Naval Systems 1997-1998

External links

 RBU-6000 on the manufacturer's official website 
 Russia launches serial production of upgraded rockets for anti-submarine warfare system

Naval weapons of the Cold War
Anti-submarine missiles
Cold War weapons of the Soviet Union
Military equipment introduced in the 1960s
NPO Splav products